Ustad Fazal Qureshi ( born 13 February 1961) is an Indian tabla player. Born to the tabla player  Ustad Allah Rakha, under the guidance of his father/guru, with the inspiration drawn from his brother, Ustad Zakir Hussain, he has also become a tabla player. He has expanded his horizons by being involved with other styles of music of the world especially Jazz and Western classical music, and has performed with many well known Jazz musicians. For the last 16 years he has been associated with Mynta, his world music band based in Sweden. They have performed all over the world and have released six albums. He teaches tabla to students in the Ustad Alla Rakha Institute of Music near Shivaji Park, Dadar.,

Personal life 
Fazal is married to Birwa, an interior designer from school of interior design, CEPT UNI, and a folk dancer. They have a daughter, Alia, who is studying ballet, and a son, Azann, who is learning piano.

References

1961 births
Living people
Tabla players
Indian drummers
Musicians from Mumbai